The Golden Howdah (elephant seat or Chinnada Ambari in Kannada) is a howdah, the carrier mounted on the leading elephant during the Jamboo Savari (Elephant Procession) of the famous Mysore Dasara. It is the cynosure of all eyes during the famous Dasara festivities. Since 2012, it has been carried by Arjuna.

The Howdah 
The exact date of its making is not known. The 750-kg-howdah, used in the Jamboo Savari (elephant procession) on the Vijayadashami day, has two wide seats in rows, bigger than the interiors of a family car. The Rajas of Mysore used this howdah in the famous Dasara procession, which traversed through the thoroughfares of the princely city during the festival every year. But since the abolition of royalty the statue of Chamundeshwari is being carried in the howdah. The Howdah is made of Pure gold. The core structure is wood and it was covered in filigreed gold sheets weighing 85 kilograms by "Swarnakala Nipuna" Singannacharya. It has three deftly carved pillars on each of the four sides. It is covered with a canopy resembling a crown. There are five sacred "Kalashas" on top of it. The seat itself is made of silver, alluring designs embellishing it, and it will be shown in only dasara times.

The procession 
The golden Howdah is mounted on the lead elephant with the idol of deity (Nadadevathe) Chamundeshwari placed in it. The procession of over 5.5 kilometers passes through the Mysore city, beginning at Mysore Palace and terminating at Bannimantapa. The elephant carrying the Howdah is trained and groomed to do the job years before it actually does it. Balarama has the distinction of participating in the procession 19 times and has carried the Howdah on thirteen occasions, between 1999 and 2011. 
After taking over from him in 2012, Arjuna has been the carrier.

References

Culture of Mysore